Proszowice  is a town in southern Poland, situated in the Lesser Poland Voivodeship (since 1999), previously in Kraków Voivodeship (1975–1998). Its population numbers 6,206 inhabitants (2004). It is the capital of Proszowice County, and the town is located some 25 kilometers northeast of Kraków, on the right bank of the Szreniawa river. Proszowice received its Magdeburg rights charter in 1358. Proszowice has a sports club Proszowianka, established in 1916. 

First mention about the village of Proszowice comes from 1222. The origin of its name is not known, probably the village was named after a knight named Proszkomir, who lived here. By 1240, Proszowice already had a brick church of St. John the Baptist. The village was privately owned, and in the mid-14th century it became royal property of King Kazimierz Wielki, who granted it town charter in 1358. The King greatly contributed to the development of Proszowice, building here a palace, which for some time was one of the royal residences (later on, its role was taken on by the Niepołomice Castle). Proszowice prospered due to several royal privileges. A number of artisans lived here, there was a parish school, and the period from the early 15th century to the early 17th century is regarded as Golden Age of the town, which was one of the most important centers of Kraków Voivodeship; here sejmiks took place. King Kazimierz Jagiellończyk initiated the construction of a new church, which was finished in 1454 and was among most impressive Gothic churches in Lesser Poland. Here, Stańczyk, the legendary court jester was born, and in the 16th century, Proszowice became one of centers of Protestant Reformation. All Catholic churches in the area were turned into Calvinist or Polish Brethren prayer houses, but later on, the Counter-Reformation prevailed. In 1616, the town was almost completely burned in a fire. Like almost all towns of Lesser Poland, Proszowice was destroyed in the Swedish invasion of Poland (1655–1660).

After Partitions of Poland, Proszowice first belonged to the Habsburg Empire, but in 1815 it became part of Russian-controlled Congress Poland. During January Uprising, several skirmishes took place in the area of the town, and as a punishment, the Russians reduced Proszowice to the status of a village (1869). In 1923, already in Kielce Voivodeship of the Second Polish Republic, Proszowice regained its town charter. In 1999 the town became the seat of a county. 

The center of Proszowice is of typical medieval shape, with a market square and streets radiating from it. Houses in the market square, however, are modern, most of them were built in the 20th century. Once there was a town hall, which was dismantled in the mid-19th century. Local parish church was first erected in the 13th century, during the reign of Prince Bolesław V the Chaste. The first church burned between 1306 and 1308. New complex was built in 1325, and most likely, it burned in a fire in 1407. Third parish church was completed in 1454. It was partly destroyed after a storm in May 1824, when one of the walls collapsed, together with the Gothic vault. The reconstruction took 12 years.

References
 History of Proszowice and Proszowice County

External links
 Jewish Community in Proszowice on Virtual Shtetl
 Places in Proszowice

Cities and towns in Lesser Poland Voivodeship
Proszowice County
Kraków Voivodeship (14th century – 1795)
Kielce Governorate
Kielce Voivodeship (1919–1939)